Penelope is a 1909 play by W. Somerset Maugham. The play ran for 246 performances.

References

External links
 

1909 plays
Plays by W. Somerset Maugham